Potassium hexafluorophosphate is the chemical compound with the formula KPF6.  This colourless salt consists of potassium cations and hexafluorophosphate anions.  It is prepared by the reaction:
PCl5  +  KCl  +  6 HF  →  KPF6  +  6 HCl
This exothermic reaction is conducted in liquid hydrogen fluoride.  The salt is stable in hot alkaline aqueous solution, from which it can be recrystallized.  The sodium and ammonium salts are more soluble in water whereas the rubidium and caesium salts are less so.

KPF6 is a common laboratory source of the hexafluorophosphate anion, a non-coordinating anion that confers lipophilicity to its salts.  These salts are often less soluble than the closely related tetrafluoroborates.

References

Potassium compounds
Hexafluorophosphates